"Maalaala Mo Kaya" (original title in Spanish: "Dulce princesa")  is a song written by Filipino composer Constancio De Guzman.

It was covered by singers such as The New Minstrels, Pilita Corrales, Eva Eugenio, Leo Valdez, Diomedes Maturan and Ryan Cayabyab. 

Though the song was originally written in Spanish, famed Filipino author Guillermo Gómez Rivera is the only artist to record the song in Spanish under the title "Dulce Princesa" for his 1960 LP album Nostalgia Filipina. 

A cover version by Dulce has been featured by the television drama anthology of the same name. The TV show uses another cover version, performed by Carol Banawa from 2004 to 2021, and another by JM Yosures since 2021, for its closing credits.

In 2009, it was performed as part of a weekly task in the third season of Pinoy Big Brother, during the "Big Swap" between a housemate and a contestant from Big Brother Finland. The song was performed as a duet between housemate Tom Mott and BB Finland's Kätlin Laas.

In 2015, the song was mentioned in Mitch Albom's book The Magic Strings of Frankie Presto as the song that the title character played for the girl he fell in love with when he was a boy in war-torn Spain in 1944.

References

External links 
 Maalaala Mo Kaya – song information from the Organisasyon ng Pilipinong Mang-aawit (OPM)

Albom, Mitch. "The Magic Strings of Frankie Presto".  1st ed. HarperCollins Publishers. 2015

Tagalog-language songs
1960 songs